Strange Evidence (also known as Dance of the Witches, and Wife in Pawn) is a 1933 British crime film directed by Robert Milton, produced by Alexander Korda and written by Lajos Bíró and Miles Malleson. Starring Leslie Banks, George Curzon, Carol Goodner and Frank Vosper,  it is a film made by Alexander Korda's London Film Productions at British and Dominions Imperial Studios, Elstree, with art direction by R.Holmes Paul.

Premise
A promiscuous wife prefers a love affair with her cousin to caring for her sick husband, while also fighting off the advances of her lust crazed brother-in-law. When her husband is found poisoned to death, she is suspect No.1 for his murder.

Cast
 Leslie Banks as Francis Relf  
 Carol Goodner as Marie / Barbara Relf  
 George Curzon as Stephen Relf  
 Frank Vosper as Andrew Relf  
 Norah Baring as Clare Relf  
 Haidee Wright as Mrs. Relf  
 Lyonel Watts as Henry Relf  
 Lewis Shaw as Larry  
 Diana Napier as Jean
 Merle Oberon bit part
 Miles Malleson uncredited, also co-wrote

Reception
English film critic Leslie Halliwell considered Strange Evidence to be a "mildly interesting quickie whodunnit".

References

External links

1933 films
1933 crime films
Films produced by Alexander Korda
Films directed by Robert Milton
British black-and-white films
British crime films
Films shot at Imperial Studios, Elstree
1930s English-language films
1930s British films